Ó an Cháintighe, an Irish Bardic family of west Cork. The medieval poet Fear Feasa Ó'n Cháinte was the composer of the following poems:

 A shaoghail ón a shaoghail
 Bean dá chumhadh críoch Ealla
 Gluais a litir go Lunndain

The surname is derived from the Gaelic term cáinteach (satirical). It is now given as Ó Canty or Canty.

See also
 Tadhg Olltach Ó an Cháinte
 Graham Canty

External links
 http://www.ucc.ie/celt/itbardic.html#feasaonchainte

References

 The Surnames of Ireland, Edward MacLysaght, Dublin, 1978, p. 36.

Irish families
Surnames
Irish Brehon families
Surnames of Irish origin
Irish-language masculine surnames
Families of Irish ancestry